The Carphone Warehouse Limited was a mobile phone retailer based in London, United Kingdom. In August 2014 the company became a subsidiary of Currys plc (previously named "Dixons Carphone"), which was formed by the merger of its former parent Carphone Warehouse Group with Dixons Retail. Prior to this merger, Carphone Warehouse Group was listed on the London Stock Exchange, and was a constituent of the FTSE 250 Index. Following the closure of all stand-alone UK stores in April 2020, all remaining Carphone Warehouse UK outlets were within branches of Currys PC World. In April 2021, the Carphone Warehouse business in Ireland (including all stand-alone and co-located branches and the website) was closed with immediate effect. Currys continued to use the Carphone Warehouse brand in the United Kingdom, online and, until 2021, inside Currys stores.

History

Early years
The company was co-founded in 1989 by Sir Charles Dunstone and Julian Brownlie, who put £6,000 into the company from their savings. Guy Johnson of NEC UK became the second partner at the company, later taking up the role of Logistics and Distribution director. In 1990, Dunstone brought in his school friend David Ross, a chartered accountant, who became Chief Operating Officer in the same year.

1999 to 2009
In January 1999, the company bought Tandy's operations in the United Kingdom for £9 million. In July 2000, Carphone Warehouse issued an IPO. In July 2001, Johnson sold the majority of his stake and retired. Carphone Warehouse bought Opal Telecom in November 2002.

In 2003, Ross started to step down from the COO role. In July 2005, he became deputy chairman. On 10 October 2006, the Carphone Warehouse announced that it would purchase the Internet access business of AOL in the United Kingdom for £370m. Also in that month, it was announced that Geek Squad would be launching in the United Kingdom, in a 50/50 joint venture between Carphone Warehouse and Best Buy.

In May 2008, Best Buy agreed to buy a 50% share in Carphone Warehouse's retail business for £1.1 billion, to launch the Best Buy Europe joint venture, named CPW Europe. Best Buy and Carphone Warehouse also opened joint venture stores in the United States.

Ross, by now a non-executive director, resigned from the board in December 2008.

2010 to present 
In 2010, the broadband and home phone business was spun off as TalkTalk.

In May 2014, Carphone Warehouse Group and Dixons Retail announced their merger to create Dixons Carphone. The merger completed on 7 August 2014. The Dixons Group staff moved into 1 Portal Way, the original home of Carphone Warehouse in West London, in May 2015.

In May 2015, Carphone Warehouse launched iD Mobile, a mobile virtual network operator using Three's network.

In April 2020, products and services from the O2 network ceased to be available from Carphone Warehouse after the companies were unable to reach a contractual agreement.

Closure of stand-alone UK stores
In March 2020, the company announced that they would be closing all 531 stand-alone UK stores the following month, with sales operations continuing within co-located "shops within shops" at Currys PC World stores and through the website. It was said that this measure was a result of the changing mobile market.

Closure in Ireland
On 21 April 2021, the company announced that the entire business in Ireland, including all 69 standalone stores in Ireland, 12 outlets within other stores, and the carphonewarehouse.ie website would close with immediate effect, with the loss of 486 jobs. The company stated the closures were in line with the decision to close all UK stores the previous year, with the changes in the mobile market and customer shopping behaviour being accelerated by the COVID-19 pandemic. Owner Dixons Carphone noted that it would continue to sell phones and accessories in Ireland through Currys PC World stores and the Currys website.

Demergers and disposals
On 8 May 2009, Carphone Warehouse agreed to pay £236m in cash for the United Kingdom assets of Tiscali, an Italian telecoms group. Tiscali UK later became part of TalkTalk.

In March 2010, TalkTalk and Carphone Warehouse split and Dido Harding became CEO of TalkTalk, and Roger Taylor CEO of New Carphone Warehouse. Dunstone remained Chairman of both companies. On 30 April 2013, Carphone Warehouse agreed to purchase Best Buy's 50% stake in Best Buy Europe for £500 million.

Carphone Warehouse owned 46% of Virgin Mobile France in a joint venture with Virgin Group. In June 2014, Carphone and Virgin agreed to sell Virgin Mobile France to Numericable for €325 million. French competition regulators, ARCEP, approved the deal in November 2014.

Data protection issues
During April 2005, customers who bought mobile phones from Carphone Warehouse retail outlets alleged that their landline accounts were subsequently switched without their consent.

On 15 August 2006, the Information Commissioner's Office issued Preliminary Enforcement Notices for breaches of PECR (The Privacy and Electronic Communications Regulations) against Carphone Warehouse and TalkTalk for making marketing calls to people who were signed up to the Telephone Preference Service (TPS) or people who had asked that the company make no further calls to them. On 28 October 2006, in an interview in The Times, Richard Thomas, Britain's Information Commissioner, stated:

We're taking action against some of the telecom companies, Talk Talk and Carphone Warehouse. We're taking action against them because we've had a lot of complaints that they've been telephoning people with marketing calls, people whose name is on the telephone preference service. And then we do these prosecutions, particularly with private detectives. We've got a big case coming up.

On 5 August 2015, hackers gained access to customer data for 2.4 million people who had used sites operated by Carphone Warehouse, including OneStopPhoneShop.com, e2save.com, Mobiles.co.uk and TalkTalk Group.

In January 2018, the company was fined £400,000 by the ICO for "multiple inadequacies" in Carphone's security processes, including using old software and failing to carry out routine security testing. Intruders were able to access personal information, including the names, addresses, phone numbers, dates of birth, marital status and, in more than 18,000 cases, historical payment card details of customers of Carphone Warehouse.

Marketing and sponsorship

The X Factor
On 19 June 2007, Carphone Warehouse became the official sponsor of the fourth series of The X Factor. The sponsorship deal was to last for three years. Carphone Warehouse also became the sponsor of its spin off show, The Xtra Factor. After Carphone Warehouse and TalkTalk split, TalkTalk took over the sole sponsorship of The X Factor.

Big Brother
The company were the sponsors for the United Kingdom's version of Big Brother from 2004 to 2007. In 2006, they also sponsored Celebrity Big Brother and related Celebrity Big Brother shows on Channel 4.

On 17 January 2007, in response to alleged racism in Celebrity Big Brother, Charles Dunstone said: "We are talking to Channel 4. The sponsorship is constantly under review. Clearly we are against racism. Most people understand that the person who has their name associated with the programme does not necessarily condone the content."

On 18 January 2007, Carphone Warehouse announced that it had suspended its sponsorship of the show as Channel 4 had not taken sufficient action in response to the alleged racism in the show. On 8 March 2007, the company permanently dropped its sponsorship of the show.

Appy Awards
In April 2011, Carphone Warehouse sponsored the Appy Awards, calling them "the United Kingdom’s first major app awards ceremony designed to recognise innovation and development in app technology".

Charity support
In October 2001, Carphone Warehouse established a corporate partnership with Get Connected UK, a confidential helpline service for young people, that continues today as "The Mix". Carphone Warehouse supplies Get Connected with office and helpline equipment and has been instrumental in ensuring it is free to call from all landlines and mobiles. This partnership won the Charity Times Corporate Partnership Award in 2003 and the Third Sector Excellence Award for Corporate Partnership in 2006.

See also

 Local loop unbundling

References

External links
 

1989 establishments in England
Best Buy
British companies established in 1989
British Royal Warrant holders
Companies formerly listed on the London Stock Exchange
Consumer electronics retailers of the United Kingdom
Defunct retail companies of the United Kingdom
Currys plc
Mobile phone companies of the United Kingdom
Mobile virtual network operators
Retail companies based in London
Retail companies established in 1989
Telecommunications companies established in 1989
Telecommunications companies of the United Kingdom
2021 disestablishments in Ireland